Government Arts College for Women, Pudukkottai, is a women's general degree college located in Pudukkottai, Tamil Nadu. It was established in the year 1965. The college is affiliated with Bharathidasan University. This college offers different courses in arts, commerce and science.

Departments

Science

Physics
Chemistry
Mathematics
Statistics
Computer Science
Botany
Zoology

Arts and Commerce

Tamil
English
History
Economics
Commerce

Accreditation
The college is  recognized by the University Grants Commission (UGC).

References

External links
http://www.gacfwpdkt.com/

Educational institutions established in 1969
1969 establishments in Tamil Nadu
Colleges affiliated to Bharathidasan University